"Apollo Jump" is a 1943 instrumental, written by Lucky Millinder, P. Robinson and Ernest Purce   and recorded by Lucky Millinder and His Orchestra.  The single was Lucky Millinder's second number one on the Harlem Hit Parade and stayed at number one for two weeks.

See also
List of Billboard number-one R&B singles of the 1940s

References

1943 songs
1940s instrumentals